The Rider Broncs baseball team is a varsity intercollegiate athletic team of Rider University in Lawrenceville, New Jersey, United States. The team is a member of the Metro Atlantic Athletic Conference, which is part of the NCAA Division I. The team plays its home games at Sonny Pittaro Field in Lawrenceville, New Jersey. The Broncs are coached by Barry Davis.

MLB Players

See also
List of NCAA Division I baseball programs
College baseball

References

External links